Sheykh Saleh (also Romanized as Sheykh Şāleḩ; also known as Sheykh Şāleḩ Sā‘īd) is a village in Seyyed Abbas Rural District, Shavur District, Shush County, Khuzestan Province, Iran. At the 2006 census, its population was 343, in 44 families.

References 

Populated places in Shush County